Ocean Village is a mixed-use marina, residential, business, and leisure development in Gibraltar, in the North end of the Iberian peninsula. The project features 316 residential apartments, over 250 marina berths and extensive business accommodation. Construction of the first phase of Ocean Village commenced in 2006, with the latest completed addition of the World Trade Center in 2017. The current recreational facilities within the overall complex include two casinos, numerous eateries, and bars and the Sunborn Yacht Hotel. Due for completion in 2019 are a further 244 apartments with future plans to incorporate additional superyacht berthing and a waterside villa complex. The marina is paved in a Portuguese pavement style.

Marina

In June 2012, the Ocean Village Marina hosted the Gibraltar Diamond Jubilee Flotilla.

Leisure Island Business Centre
The land reclamation project was completed in October 2009. The Business Centre has been fully occupied since its launch with a mixture of international brands including KPMG. The first two levels of the building house Casino Admiral (formerly Gala Casino) with three levels of executive office facilities above.

World Trade Center Gibraltar
The seven-level, 17,000 square metre, world class resource, completed in 2017 is home to over sixty innovative, high tech companies. This new building was the latest to join the list of properties operating under the prestigious WTC brand in 90 countries across the globe. World Trade Center Gibraltar won the European Property Awards, Best Office Development Gibraltar in 2017.

Residential apartments
Upon launch in 2003, the first residential plaza became the fastest selling large scale development in Gibraltar’s history, selling out in four hours.

The four blue glass residential towers; Royal Ocean Plaza, Grand Ocean Plaza, Majestic Ocean Plaza and Imperial Ocean Plaza have seven swimming pools and six jacuzzis set in tropical gardens. The fifth 17 storey, elliptical Ocean Spa Plaza has its own pools and spas.

They have won a number of awards including 2010 Bloomberg Television European Residential Property Awards and 2008 CNBC Europe & Africa Property Awards.

Casino
Casino Admiral operates two casinos within Ocean Village and was the first European facility to house a casino, bingo club and sports betting zone under one roof.  The casinos offer a choice of 250 jackpot slots, 80-seat poker and roulette. The venues have six bars.

Shops, restaurants and bars
Suspended above the water's edge, the piers house international restaurants offering Italian, Asian and South American cuisine. Restaurants and bars include: wagamama, Las Iguanas, O'Reilly's Irish Bar, The Ivy Sportsbar, The Bridge Bar, Pizza Express, The Yard, Little Bay, Grand Shanghai, and Dusk Nightclub.

See also

 Marina Bay, Gibraltar
 Queensway Quay Marina, Gibraltar

References

Marinas in Gibraltar